Macrochaeteumatidae is a family of millipedes belonging to the order Chordeumatida. Adult millipedes in this family have only 28 segments (counting the collum as the first segment and the telson as the last) rather than the 30 segments usually found in this order.

Genera:
 Antroremya
 Calochaeteuma Miyosi, 1958
 Macrochaeteuma Verhoeff, 1914

References

Chordeumatida